Sangan (also Romanized as Sangān; also known as Sangān-e Pā’īn, Sangān Pā’īn, Sangūn-e Pā’īn, and Sangūn-i-Pāīn) is a city and capital of Sangan District, in Khaf County, Razavi Khorasan Province, Iran. At the 2006 census, its population was 8,718, in 1,952 families.

Geographical location and climate 
Sangan located at  elevation of 1146.01 meters (3759.88 feet) above sea level and has a Mid-latitude steppe climate. Sangan typically receives about 44.0 millimeters of precipitation and has 78.16 rainy days annually.

References 

Populated places in Khaf County
Cities in Razavi Khorasan Province